Government College, Tripunithura, is a government general degree college located in Tripunithura, Kerala. It was established in the year 1982. The college is affiliated with Mahatma Gandhi University. This college offers different courses in arts, commerce and science.

Departments

Science

Statistics

Arts and Commerce

Malayalam
English
Hindi
History
Economics
Physical Education
Commerce

Accreditation
The college is  recognized by the University Grants Commission (UGC).

References

External links
http://gcte.ac.in

Universities and colleges in Kochi
Educational institutions established in 1982
1982 establishments in Kerala
Arts and Science colleges in Kerala
Colleges affiliated to Mahatma Gandhi University, Kerala